The Church of the Madonna dell'Archetto is a small oratory in Rome, Italy, in the Trevi rione. The official title of the church is Santa Maria Causa Nostrae Laetitiae. It is often cited as being the smallest church in Rome.

History and description
The chapel was constructed in the nineteenth century to house a venerated image of the Madonna that was located under a narrow arched passageway of the Palazzo Muti, The image had been commissioned by the marchesa Muti Papazzurri in 1690. It is a depiction  painted by Bolognese painter Domenico Muratori on maiolica of the Blessed Virgin. In 1696, the image was reputedly seen to move her eyes, which prompted the owner to expose the image to public veneration. By 1751, gates to the alley where the image was located were installed, and a repeat miracle on July 9, 1796, cemented the reputation of the image. The 1796 incident occurred before numerous witnesses, who also observed that the eyes of the painting wept—presumably in reaction to that year's invasion of the Papal States by France.

In the middle of the nineteenth century, marchese Alessandro Muti Papazzurri Savorelli decided to construct a small chapel to house the miraculous image, which until that point was still located in a narrow alley. The chapel, which was built in the available space at the end of the alleyway, is an example, rare in Rome, of Neo-Renaissance architecture. The interior was covered in precious marbles, the work of architect Virginio Vespignani. The cupola was frescoed by Constantino Brumidi, the same painter who executed the frescoes in the United States Capitol. There are also sculptures by Luigi Simonetti. The miraculous image of the Virgin is located above the altar. The church was solemnly dedicated on May 31, 1851.

The oratory today falls within the parish boundaries of the nearby Basilica of Santi Apostoli, and is categorized as an "annexed" church.

Inscription 
The Jesuit archaeologist Giuseppe Marchi composed the following Latin inscription, which is located on the exterior of the chapel:

References

Sources

Roman Catholic churches in Rome
Roman Catholic churches completed in 1851
1851 establishments in the Papal States
Churches of Rome (rione Trevi)
19th-century Roman Catholic church buildings in Italy